Caryl Thomas (born 19 February 1986) is a Welsh Rugby Union player. She plays loosehead prop for Bristol Bears and Wales, and fullback for Worcester Warriors. She represented Wales at the 2021 Women's Six Nations Championship.

Club career 
Thomas began her club career with Bath Rugby before moving to Bristol Bears as prop in 2019, and to Worcester Warriors as fullback in 2020.

International career 
Thomas made her debut for the Wales women's national rugby union team in 2006 against Italy as a loosehead prop. She then returned to the Wales squad for the 2010 World Cup campaign, and has played regularly for the team since, including the Women's Rugby World Cup in 2014 and 2017, and the Six Nations Championships in 2017, 2019 and 2021.

Thomas has earned 58 caps over the course of her career. She was selected in Wales squad for the 2021 Rugby World Cup in New Zealand.

Personal life 
When she's not playing rugby professionally, Thomas can still be found on the pitch, either as head coach for the University of Bath women's rugby team, or in her capacity as impact manager for The Bath Rugby Foundation.

Thomas also previously played for Bath Buccaneers hockey team.

References

External links 

 

Living people
1986 births
Rugby union players from Carmarthen
20th-century Welsh women
21st-century Welsh women
Welsh female rugby union players
Wales international rugby union players
Rugby union props